Fred Driver was an English professional association footballer who played as an inside forward.

References

Year of birth unknown
Year of death missing
English footballers
Association football forwards
Burnley F.C. players
English Football League players
Trawden F.C. players